Kappa Lambda Chi Military Fraternity Inc. ( or KLC) is a non-collegiate, national service based fraternity, considered a professional fraternity. Kappa Lambda Chi was founded as a professional fraternity that caters exclusively to the military members of all branches.  Today, Kappa Lambda Chi has more than 20 Chapters in the continental United States and abroad.

History 
Kappa Lambda Chi was founded on July 4, 2013, in Clinton, North Carolina, as an alternative to traditional Greek letter organizations for male service members. KLC is the very first Greek-lettered fraternity established and incorporated by U.S. Armed Forces men. Fraternity members currently serve or have previously served their country honorably in all branches of the United States Military.

Kappa Lambda Chi members support veterans in need in and around their local communities through volunteer service. Members work with homeless shelters, abuse centers, children centers, and other organizations that provide hands on support to organization that do not receive the support from external sources. Members also honor those who have served this nation by placing wreaths on the graves of veterans and service members in each branch of the military including Merchant Marines, prisoners of war and those named missing in action.

Kappa Lambda Chi Military Fraternity Incorporated was built as an alternative for male service members whom want to become a part of a Greek letter organization. The three founding members: Sir Zachary D.S. Wyatt II, William Dickey, James K. Jackson took pride in the development of the first Greek-lettered military fraternity and created a unique Brotherhood for both past and present members of the United States Armed Forces.

Original 9 
Kappa Lambda Chi's 3 founding members are Sir Zachary D. S. Wyatt II (Air Force Veteran), William C. Dickey (Army Retired), and James K. Jackson (Army Retired). Their 6 founding board members are Demetrius Blalock (Army Retired), Gary Degraffenreidt (Army Reserve), Dennis G. Morton Jr. (Army Retired), Kevin Taylor (Army Retired), Daryl Harris II (Active Navy), and Dana McGhee (Air Force Retired).

National presidents (2013–present) 
Bernard Johnson (2018–Present)
LaHarold Woodhouse (2017-2018)
Everett Mays (2015–2017)
Tyrone Cave (2014–2015)
Sir Zachary D.S. Wyatt II (2013–2014)

Local chapters 
 Alpha - Hampton Roads, Virginia 
 Alpha Alpha - San Antonio, Texas
 Beta - Northern Virginia 
 Gamma - Killeen, Texas 
 Delta - Fayetteville, North Carolina 
 Epsilon - Atlanta, Georgia 
 Zeta- El Paso, Texas
 Eta - Columbia, South Carolina 
 Theta - Clarksville, Tennessee 
 Iota - Augusta, Georgia 
 Kappa - Memphis, Tennessee
 Lambda - Little Rock, Arkansas 
 Mu - San Diego, California
 Nu - Kansas City, Missouri 
 Xi - Jacksonville, Florida
 Omicron - Laurel, Maryland
 Pi - Honolulu, Hawaii 
 Chi - Los Angeles, California
 Rho - Columbus GA
 Sigma - Savannah, GA
 Tau - Fort Lee, Virginia
 Upsilon - Tampa, Florida
Alpha Kappa -Houston, TX

Local detachments 
 Cincinnati, OH
 Dallas, TX
 Birmingham, AL
 Warner Robins, GA
 Valdosta/Pensacola
 Colorado Springs, CO
 JBLM, WA
 Washington, DC
 Charlotte, NC
 New Orleans, LA

International 
 Korea
 Spain
Japan

Affiliations 
 Kappa Epsilon Psi Military Sorority Inc. - Military and Veterans Fraternity: 2011

References

External links 
 militaryfraternity.com

Professional military fraternities and sororities in the United States
2013 establishments in North Carolina
Organizations established in 2013
Professional Fraternity Association